The 16th Rhythmic Gymnastics European Championships were held in Zaragoza, Spain from 1 June to 4 June 2000.

After the European Championships, the International Gymnastics Federation suspended six judges for discriminating against a Ukrainian gymnast, Olena Vitrychenko. The following judges were found guilty: Irina Deryugina (Ukraine), Natalya Stepanova (Belarus), Gabriela Shtumer (Austria), Galina Margina (Latvia), Natalya Ladzinskaya (Russia) and Ursula Zolenkamp (Germany). Olena Vitrychenko left the competition on the second day in sign of protestation.

Medal winners

Medal table

References 

2000 in gymnastics
Rhythmic Gymnastics European Championships
Sports scandals